The Auditor of the Literary and Historical Society at University College Dublin, Ireland is a position elected by the members of the society. In this setting, the term auditor has no connection with accounting but means "a position corresponding to that of President of the Union at Oxford or Cambridge" (Oxford English Dictionary). Some former auditors of the society have gone on to careers of high distinction in law, politics, medicine, academia, journalism, and other endeavours.

This is a list of the auditors from when the society was founded by John Henry Newman in 1855 to the present:

 1856–1857    Henry S. Bethell
 1857–1858    Augustus P. Bethell
 1858–1859    Hugh Hyacinth MacDermot
 1859–1860    Richard Fennelly
 1861–1862    Philip Farrelly
 1862–1863    John Kean
 1863–1864    John Butler
 1864–1865    Morgan B. Kavanagh
 1865–1866    Robert Wogan MacDonnell
 1866–1867    Patrick J. O'Connor
 1867–1868    Charles Dawson
 1868–1869    N. J. Gossan
 1869–1870    William Dillon
 1870–1871    George Fottrell
 1871–1872    Michael Charles Aughney
 1872–1873    Michael Francis Cox
 1873–1874    Michael O'Meara
 1874–1875    John Dillon
 1875–1876    Gerald Griffin
 1876–1877    John Francis O'Carroll
 1877–1878    Michael Duff
 1878–1879    Ignatius O'Brien
 1880–1881    J. D. McFeeley
 1882–1883    Joseph McGrath
 1883–1884    Thomas A Finlay, S. J.
 1884–1885    Robert Donovan
 1885–1886    Edmund Young
 1886–1887    Joseph J. Farrell
 1887–1888    Patrick Lennox
 1888–1889    William Magennis
 1889–1890    John F. W. Howley
 1890–1891    Luke Nolan
 1897–1898    Charles Griffin / Francis Skeffington
 1898–1899    Thomas M. Kettle
 1899–1900    Arthur E. Clery
 1900-1901    Hugh Kennedy
 1901-1902    Robert Kinahan
 1902-1903    William Dawson
 1903-1904    John P. Doyle
 1904-1905    Richard Sheehy
 1905-1906    Thomas F. Bacon
 1906–1907    Francis Cruise O'Brien
 1907–1908    Maurice Healy
 1908–1909    Thomas Bodkin
 1909–1910    Michael McGilligan
 1910–1911    Michael Davitt
 1911–1912    John A. Ronayne / Patrick McGilligan
 1912–1913    Arthur Cox
 1913–1914    Michael J. Ryan
 1914–1915    James R. MacDonnell
 1915–1916    James G. O'Connor
 1916–1917    Joseph Mooney
 1917–1918    H. Garrett McGrath
 1918–1919    Thomas F. Aird
 1919–1920    Daniel Binchy
 1920–1921    John Farrell
 1921–1922    James Skehan
 1922–1923    David H. Travers
 1923–1924    John Charles Flood
 1924–1925    Bernard J. M. MacKenna
 1925–1926    Anthony J. Malone / Richard K. Boylan
 1926–1927    Patrick Byrne
 1927–1928    John J. Nash
 1928–1929    Thomas A. O'Rourke
 1929–1930    William Binchy / Thomas A. O'Rourke / Robert Dudley Edwards
 1930–1931    John Kent
 1931–1932    Cearbhall Ó Dálaigh
 1932–1933    James Meenan
 1933–1934    Vivion de Valera
 1934–1935    R. N. Cooke
 1935–1936    Desmond Bell
 1936–1937    Vincent Grogan
 1937–1938    Richard Walsh
 1938–1939    Thomas F. O'Higgins
 1939–1940    Tomas P. Ó Siaghail
 1940–1941    Patrick N. Meenan
 1941–1942    Frank Roe
 1942–1943    Francis Meenan
 1943–1944    Richard Cremins / Peter Hogbin
 1944–1945    Walter Treanor
 1945–1946    Eamonn Walsh
 1946–1947    Frank Martin
 1947–1948    Kevin Burke
 1948–1949    Patrick J. O'Kelly
 1949–1950    Patrick J. Connolly
 1950–1951    Richard Ryan
 1951–1952    Dermot Ryan
 1952–1953    Diarmuid Ó Sioradain
 1953–1954    Gerard Sheehy
 1954–1955    Micheal Ó Riain
 1955–1956    Henry Kennedy
 1956–1957    Desmond P. H. Windle
 1957–1958    Myles McSwiney
 1958–1959    Owen Dudley Edwards
 1959–1960    Brian McSwiney
 1960–1961    Dermot Bouchier Hayes
 1961–1962    Desmond J. Green
 1962–1963    Louis B. Courtney
 1963–1964    Anthony W. Clare
 1964–1965    Patrick Cosgrave
 1965–1966    Henry Crawley
 1966–1967    Anthony D. Glavin / J Harold Owens
 1967–1968    Henry Kelly
 1968–1969    Dermot Gleeson
 1969–1970    Gerald Barry
 1970–1971    Mary E. Finlay
 1971–1972    Declan O'Donovan
 1972–1973    Adrian Hardiman
 1973–1974    Kevin Cross
 1974–1975    J. Gerard Danaher
 1975–1976    Michael Moloney
 1976–1977    Paul O'Higgins
 1977–1978    Frank Callanan
 1978–1979    Maev-Ann Wren
 1979–1980    Gerard Stembridge
 1980–1981    Charles Meenan
 1981–1982    Laurence Ward
 1982–1983    Cormac Lucey
 1983–1984    Shane Murphy
 1984–1985    Dermot Meagher / Isobel Murray
 1985–1986    Eamon Delaney
 1986–1987    Richard Humphreys
 1987–1988    Denise McDonald
 1988–1989    Oliver O'Brien
 1989–1990    Jason A. Devitt
 1990–1991    Pat O'Keeffe
 1991–1992    Sinéad E. Canning
 1992–1993    Marcus Dowling
 1993–1994    Tabitha Wood
 1994–1995    Padraig Francis; Dara Ó Briain
 1995–1996    Ian Walsh
 1996–1997    Alastair McMenamin
 1997–1998    Tom Wright
 1998–1999    Barry Ward
 1999–2000    Patrick E. Smyth
 2000–2001    J. Paul Brady
 2001–2002    Brian Flanagan
 2002–2003    Jarlath Regan
 2003–2004    Ciaran Lawlor
 2004–2005    Frank Kennedy
 2005–2006    Louisa Ní Eadeáin
 2006–2007    Ross McGuire; David O'Connor [Vice-Auditor]
 2007–2008    Michael MacGrath
 2008–2009    Ian Hastings
 2009–2010    Conor McAndrew
 2010–2011    Niall Fahy
 2011–2012    Christine Simpson
 2012–2013    Daisy Onubogu
 2013–2014    Alex Owens
 2014–2015    Eoin MacLachlan
 2015–2016    Conor Rock
 2016–2017    Donal Naylor
 2017–2018    Aisling Tully
 2018–2019    Ella McLoughlin
 2019–2020    Anthony Tracey
 2020–2021    Samuel Ajetunmobi
 2021–2022    Rob Fitzpatrick
 2022–2023    Adrianne Ward

References